The 1982 Buffalo Bills season was the franchise's 13th season in the National Football League, and the 23rd overall. Due to the 1982 NFL strike, the season was shortened to only nine games; the Bills' 4–5 record left them in the 9th spot in the AFC (one spot away from the last playoff seed), therefore eliminating the Bills from the playoffs in the 16-team tournament format.

The Bills led the league in rushing in 1982, with 1,371 yards (152.3 per game) on the ground. This was the last season with Chuck Knox as head coach, as negotiations for a new contract with ownership failed, which led him to leave Buffalo for the Seattle Seahawks in January 1983.

Offseason

NFL draft

Linebacker Eugene Marve played linebacker for Buffalo for six seasons. Placekicker Gary Anderson went on to become the second-leading scorer in NFL history, although he did so with five other NFL teams, as he never played a regular-season game for Buffalo.

Personnel

Staff/coaches

Roster

Regular season

Schedule

Note: Intra-division opponents are in bold text.

Game summaries

Week 1

Week 2

Week 5

Week 6

Terry Bradshaws worst game in NFL

Standings

Awards and honors

All-Pros

First Team
Fred Smerlas, Nose tackle

Second Team
Ben Williams, Defensive end

References

 Bills on Pro Football Reference
 Bills on jt-sw.com
 Bills Stats on jt-sw.com

Buffalo Bills seasons
Buffalo Bills
Buffalo